Okskaya is a station on the Nekrasovskaya line of the Moscow Metro. The station was opened on 27 March 2020.

Name
The station is named for the street on which it is situated. Okskaya Street in turn is named for the Oka River, a tributary of the Volga River.

References

Moscow Metro stations
Railway stations in Russia opened in 2020
Nekrasovskaya line